Phytelephas seemannii, commonly called Panama ivory palm, is a species of flowering plant in the family Arecaceae. It is one of the plants used for vegetable ivory.

Names
The species epithet seemannii honors botanist Berthold Carl Seemann who collected some of the first specimens, including the lectotype. In both the Quechua and Choco languages it is called .

Habitat
Phytelephas seemannii is native to Colombia and Panama, with much of it growing in shaded areas by rivers in lowland rainforest in Colombia's Pacific/Chocó natural region.

Subspecies
Phytelephas seemannii has two subspecies, P. s. ssp. brevipes and P. s. ssp. seemannii. P. s. ssp. brevipes is endemic to the upper Mamoní Valley in Panama, at or below  in elevation, and may be a hybrid of P. seemannii and P. macrocarpa.

Description
Phytelephas seemannii most closely resembles Phytelephas macrocarpa. However, the former has leaves that have fewer pinnae which are larger. Its trunk is also not upright but "creeping" and decumbent. Its spathes are double instead of in threes or fours. On the male flowers are only 36 stamens and not the hundreds of other species. The heads contain fewer fruits than other species, but inside are more nuts that are larger. Typically each fruit has 5 seeds protected by a  fibrous coat, and each inflorescence has up to 8 fruits. Each tree can have dozens of inflorescences at a time.

In immature seeds, the endosperm is a liquid, like in a coconut, and then later it hardens as the fruit wall softens and deteriorates.

Ecology
Panama ivory palm trees flower after the end of the dry season, between February and May. The flowers are pollinated by insects, specifically by two types of rove beetles, pollen-eating Amazoncharis spp. and their predators in the genus Xanthopygus. The Amazoncharis beetles hollow out egg chambers within the male inflorescence, similar to how beetles in the related subtribe Gyrophaenina do inside of mushrooms. Squirrels and agoutis will eat the fleshy inner mesocarp surrounding the endocarp of the fruit, but do not eat the extremely hard endosperm. The rock-hard endosperm also makes the seed immune from most insect pests. Seed dispersers include the Central American agouti (Dasyprocta punctata), and lowland paca (Agouti paca).

Uses
The seeds are traded at a regional international level as vegetable ivory, which is also called tagua. This commercial use is a threat to the species, but progress is being made on using more sustainable practices and conservation.

The jelly-like liquid in the immature seeds, which later turns into the vegetable ivory, is edible. Occasionally in the marketplaces of Guna Yala the thin crust surrounding the ivory is sold as food.

In Colombia the fronds are sometimes used for thatch.

References

External links

seemannii
Flora of Colombia
Flora of Panama
Conservation dependent plants
Ivory
Sculpture materials
Handicrafts
Plants described in 1912
Non-timber forest products
Taxonomy articles created by Polbot